
Gmina Mściwojów is a rural gmina (administrative district) in Jawor County, Lower Silesian Voivodeship, in south-western Poland.

Neighbouring gminas
Gmina Mściwojów is bordered by the town of Jawor and the gminas of Dobromierz, Legnickie Pole, Męcinka, Paszowice, Strzegom, Udanin and Wądroże Wielkie.

Villages
The gmina contains the villages of Barycz, Drzymałowice, Godziszowa, Grzegorzów, Luboradz, Marcinowice, Mściwojów, Niedaszów, Siekierzyce, Snowidza, Targoszyn and Zimnik.

Twin towns – sister cities

Gmina Mściwojów is twinned with:
 Jiřetín pod Bukovou, Czech Republic
 Profen (Elsteraue), Germany

References

Msciwojow
Jawor County